Society of Humanity was a pseudo-Masonic group in Persia, active from 1904 to 1908. 

Inspired by the radical positivism of Saint Simon and the liberal humanism of Auguste Comte, it played an important role in the Persian Constitutional Revolution.

References

Persian Constitutional Revolution
1904 establishments in Iran
1908 disestablishments in Iran